S&T Daewoo XK9 is a 9×19mm submachine gun manufactured by S&T Daewoo. It was to be used along the Heckler & Koch MP5 in ROK military special forces, but was not adopted. According to Jane's, the weapon was supposedly manufactured in 2003 and had the designation DS9A. The XK9 can be mass-produced if there is demand for it.

Variants
The only known variant is the Daewoo XK10, which has a shorter length by 590 mm with its extended stock and 348 mm if the stock is folded. In addition, it has a barrel length of 134 mm.

References

Bibliography
 

9mm Parabellum submachine guns
Trial and research firearms
Post–Cold War weapons of South Korea
Firearms of Korea